The 2021 Toyota/Save Mart 350 was a NASCAR Cup Series race held on June 6, 2021, at Sonoma Raceway in Sonoma, California. Contested over 92 laps—extended from 90 laps due to an overtime finish, on the  road course, it was the 16th race of the 2021 NASCAR Cup Series season.

Report

Background

Sonoma Raceway, formerly Sears Point Raceway and Infineon Raceway is a  road course and drag strip located on the landform known as Sears Point in the southern Sonoma Mountains in Sonoma, California, USA. It is host to one of only seven NASCAR Cup Series races each year that are run on road courses. It is also host to the NTT IndyCar Series and several other auto races and motorcycle races such as the American Federation of Motorcyclists series. Sonoma Raceway continues to host amateur, or club racing events which may or may not be open to the general public. The largest such car club is the Sports Car Club of America.

Entry list
 (R) denotes rookie driver.
 (i) denotes driver who are ineligible for series driver points.

Qualifying
Kyle Larson was awarded the pole for the race as determined by competition-based formula.

Starting Lineup

Race

Kyle Larson was awarded the pole where he dominated and won both stages. William Byron spun and slammed into Kevin Harvick and collected Corey LaJoie. Cody Ware went through dirt and slammed into Ryan Preece as Matt DiBenedetto spun. Anthony Alfredo spun and collected Christopher Bell, sending the race to overtime. On the restart, Larson would hold off teammate Chase Elliott for his second straight win and third of the season for Hendrick Motorsports' 270th Cup win.

Stage Results

Stage One
Laps: 20

Stage Two
Laps: 20

Final Stage Results

Stage Three
Laps: 50

Race statistics
 Lead changes: 13 among 7 different drivers
 Cautions/Laps: 8 for 18
 Red flags: 0
 Time of race: 3 hours, 14 minutes and 42 seconds
 Average speed:

Media

Television
Fox NASCAR televised the race in the United States on FS1 for the fifth year. Mike Joy was the lap-by-lap announcer, while six-time Sonoma winner Jeff Gordon and 2012 winner Clint Bowyer were the color commentators. Jamie Little and Regan Smith handled pit road for the television side. Larry McReynolds provided insight from the Fox Sports studio in Charlotte.

Radio
Radio coverage of the race was broadcast by the Performance Racing Network. PRN's broadcast of the race was simulcasted on Sirius XM NASCAR Radio. Doug Rice and Mark Garrow announced the race in the booth while the field was racing on the pit straightaway. Pat Patterson called the race from a stand outside of turn 2 when the field was racing up turns 2, 3 and 3a. Brad Gillie called the race from a stand outside of turn 7a when the field was racing through turns 4a and 7a. Nick Yeoman called the race when the field raced thru turns 8 and 9. Rob Albright called the race from a billboard outside turn 11 when the field was racing through turns 10 and 11. Heather DeBeaux, Brett McMillan and Wendy Venturini reported from pit lane during the race.

Standings after the race

Drivers' Championship standings

Manufacturers' Championship standings

Note: Only the first 16 positions are included for the driver standings.
. – Driver has clinched a position in the NASCAR Cup Series playoffs.

References

Toyota Save Mart 350
Toyota Save Mart 350
Toyota Save Mart 350
NASCAR races at Sonoma Raceway